James Willard Pofahl (June 18, 1917 – September 14, 1984) was a shortstop in Major League Baseball. He played for the Washington Senators.

References

External links

1917 births
1984 deaths
Major League Baseball shortstops
Washington Senators (1901–1960) players
Baseball players from Minnesota
People from Faribault, Minnesota